Id Mirab was a Kyrgyz leader who revolted against the Chinese Nationalist government in Xinjiang in 1932 during the Kirghiz rebellion. He was defeated.

References

East Turkestan independence activists
20th century in Xinjiang
Kyrgyzstani rebels